KUPI-FM is a commercial radio station located in Idaho Falls, Idaho, broadcasting on 99.1 FM.  KUPI-FM airs a simulcasting country music and format branded as "99 KUPI".

History

KADQ signed on in 1975 at 94.3 MHz. It was owned by Ted Austin until his 1977 death; his son sold the station three years later to Southwest Television Ltd., at the time owner of KZAZ-TV in Tucson, Arizona, for $240,000. However, Ted Austin Jr. later reacquired the station, owning it and an Idaho Falls construction permit until its sale to present owner Sand Hill Media in 2001 for $1.2 million.

KADQ became KSNA, a contemporary hit radio outlet known as Sunny 94.3, in 2006. In 2011, a large frequency shuffle involving dozens of stations swept the Mountain West. The 94.3 license was moved to 99.1 FM, and the existing 99.1 license was moved to 100.7. To keep the KUPI-FM country programming on 99.1, KSNA was relocated from one license at 94.3 to the other at 100.7, and the two stations also switched call signs.

Previous logos

References

External links

UPI
Country radio stations in the United States